Chegeni District is a district (bakhsh) in Dowreh County, Lorestan Province, Iran. At the 2006 census, its population was 20,823, in 4,532 families.  The District has one city: Sarab-e Dowreh. The District contains two rural districts: Teshkan Rural District and Dowreh Rural District.

References 

Districts of Lorestan Province
Dowreh County